Nosa or NOSA may refer to:

People 
 Nosa (musician) (born 1981), Nigerian gospel singer
 Nosa Igiebor (born 1990), Nigerian footballer
 Nosa Igiebor (journalist) (born 1952), Nigerian journalist
 Iuliu Nosa (born 1956), Romanian politician

Organizations 
 Norwegian Space Agency
 Iran Software  & Hardware Co. (NOSA)

Other uses 
 Nosa (antlion), an antlion genus in the tribe Palparini
 NASA Open Source Agreement
 NOAA Observing System Architecture
 Nosa, Serbia, a hamlet in Serbia